Franklin Township is a township in Story County, Iowa, USA.  As of the 2000 census, its population was 19,061.

The polling location for the township is the Gilbert Lutheran Church, 135 School Street in Gilbert.

Geography
According to the USGS, it contains three cemeteries: Bloomington Cemetery, Born Cemetery, and McMichael Cemetery.

References
 USGS Geographic Names Information System (GNIS)

External links
 US-Counties.com
 City-Data.com

Townships in Story County, Iowa
Townships in Iowa